Vəlixanlı (also, Velikhanly) is a former village in the Zardab Rayon of Azerbaijan.

References 
Map at Zardab Rayon official web site

Populated places in Zardab District